Pa Qalatan-e Pain (also Romanized as Pā Qalātān-e Pā’īn; also known as Paghalatan, Pākalātūn, Pā Qalātān, and Pā Qalātūn) is a village in Shamil Rural District, Takht District, Bandar Abbas County, Hormozgan Province, Iran. At the 2006 census, its population was 1,068, in 260 families.

References 

Populated places in Bandar Abbas County